Ty Bollinger (born 1968) is an American misinformation marketer and conspiracy theorist who promotes alternative medicine treatments for cancer and vaccine-preventable diseases. Bollinger has no medical training and has a history of disseminating misinformation about cancer treatments, anti-vaccine conspiracies, promoting ineffective or unproven cures, and other conspiracy theories on social media platforms. With his wife Charlene, he runs the website The Truth About Cancer and its associated social media accounts, where they sell books, videos, and nutritional supplements based on these ideas.

Biography 
Bollinger is a former bodybuilder, and has no medical training. He lives in Tennessee with his wife and their children.

He attributes his interest in alternative cancer treatments to losing several relatives to cancer, starting with his father in 1996. Not unlike anti-vaccination activists, he presents himself as a right-to-choose advocate rather than being anti-medicine.

The Truth About Cancer
The couple's main website is The Truth About Cancer, established in 2014. It promotes misinformation about cancer, notably that chemotherapy doesn't cure the disease, and functions as a merchandising platform for their numerous instructional videos, as well as food supplements, alternative health books, and treatments. The reach of the videos can be considerable, some having been viewed millions of times.

The Truth about Cancer videos present a variety of pseudoscientific treatments to supposedly remove toxins from the body, an approach long discredited as being incompatible with what is known about human physiology. The videos include interviews with alternative medicine advocates selling ineffective supplements and treatments, such as Matthias Rath, Mike Adams, Joseph Mercola, Jonathan Wright, Rashid Buttar, Russell Blaylock, Stanislaw Burzynski, and Tullio Simoncini. There are no interviews with oncologists or cancer researchers. Misusing medical information, they propagate myths about the efficacy of alternative treatments and conspiracy theories involving pharmaceutical companies and health professionals. Promoted treatments include detoxification, fad diets, as well as ineffective and potentially dangerous medication such as laetrile.

The website has strong commercial ties to other companies that use false or misleading information to sell products and to anti-vaccination groups. The Bollingers have said they paid $12 million to partner groups such as Children's Health Defense for website customer referrals, a practice known as affiliate marketing. This type of commercial alliance between companies and groups spreading conspiracy theories to sell products and information packages has been dubbed a "disinformation industry" by Professor Dorit Reiss. Top sellers for Bollinger's The Truth About Vaccines include prominent anti-vaccination promoters, including Sayer Ji, Robert F. Kennedy Jr., Rashid Buttar, Michael Adams and Sherri Tenpenny.

Bollinger has a history of promoting unproven or disproven cancer treatments. One of his highly circulated 2017 videos features the viral treatment known under the name of Rigvir, which originated in a Latvian laboratory. The treatment was subsequently taken off the market by the Latvian health authority, as the company could not present results of human studies to prove efficacy after it was found the doses sold contained a number of viruses that was greatly inferior to what was indicated on the packaging.
Ty Bollinger promoted lycopene as a medication reducing the risk of developing several types of cancer in 2018, when extensive studies concluded as early as 2007 that it does not prevent cancer.

Bollinger associated himself with osteopathic physician and conspiracy theorist Rashid Buttar to sell subscriptions to an organization (the International Association for a Disease-Free World) that appears to exist solely as a marketing device for doubtful cures sold by Buttar. Bollinger explains most of the website is accessible to paying members only, to discourage law enforcement officials and public health authorities from looking into the medical claims made about the products.

He was involved in the case of Cassandra Callender, a young woman who refused chemotherapy treatment for Hodgkin lymphoma in 2015. In this rare case, the Connecticut Supreme Court ordered that the life-saving treatment be administered against the will of Callender and her mother. In one of his Truth about Cancer videos, Bollinger is seen coaching Callender on how to delay the medical treatments until she reaches legal age and arranging alternative medicine treatments for her cancer. Callender did stop her treatments when she turned 18 and went to an alternative medicine clinic in Mexico where she received ineffective treatments. She eventually returned to the United States to undergo chemotherapy when her cancer returned but died in 2020.

Anti-vaccination and COVID-19

Bollinger also branched out into anti-vaccination, selling a new video series, The Truth about Vaccines from their website, with a supporting Facebook group. The videos feature interviews and commentary by several leaders of the American anti-vaccination movement, such as Children's Health Defense's Robert F. Kennedy Jr., Sherri Tenpenny, Andrew Wakefield, Barbara Loe Fisher, Del Bigtree, Sayer Ji, Joseph Mercola, and Rashid Buttar.

In 2020, the Bollingers' social media accounts had a combined reach of 3.5 million followers. In addition to promoting their merchandise and theories about cancer, they have been using their social media presence to promote misinformation about vaccines, including anti-government conspiracy theories common to the anti-vaccination movement. The newsletter they distribute to their paying customers promotes several of the major players in the anti-vaccination movement.

The Bollingers' company, TTAC Publishing, received two COVID-19 rescue loans from the federal government: in May 2020, when they stated they had 16 employees, and in February 2021 when they listed 27 employees.

In May 2021, YouTube suspended the Bollingers' Truth About Vaccines channel, as part of the platform's efforts to reduce the spread of COVID-19 misinformation. The channel boasted some 75,000 subscribers, with one video featuring Kennedy getting more than a million views. Their channel The Truth About Cancer was not impacted by the ban.

Bollinger frequently repeats claims from anti-vaccination activists. A study by NewsGuard ranks the Bollingers' Facebook page as one of the largest superspreaders of COVID-19 misinformation as of April 2020. The study found the page repeated many of the common COVID-19 false claims, including that the pandemic was planned, that the virus was built in a laboratory, and that COVID-19 is transmitted by 5G wireless technology. All of these claims have been debunked by public health units and independent medical researchers. Another analysis of Twitter and Facebook anti-vaccine content, in March 2021, found the Bollingers' to be one of 12 individual and organization accounts producing up to 65% of all anti-vaccine content on the platforms.

Stop the Steal 
Bollinger spoke at a "Stop the Steal" rally in Nashville on November 14, 2020, repeating accusations of election fraud. Such allegations of fraud were rejected by the courts due to lack of evidence, the suits being frequently characterized as being frivolous and without merit. He also spoke at a protest staged by pastor Greg Locke on November 23, 2020, against new restrictions imposed in Nashville to limit the spread of COVID-19. Bollinger encouraged protestors to ignore the measures put in place by Mayor John Cooper, telling them: "These codes are not laws, so they are not enforceable."

The couple played a significant role in organizing the pro-Trump demonstrations that culminated in a riot at the United States Capitol on January 6, 2021. They coordinated with leaders of the Stop the Steal movement to bring their supporters to the demonstrations. They introduced speakers to their crowd of supporters and according to Darlene, Ty joined the demonstration outside the Capitol; both afterward condemned the violence that took place at the event. The Bollingers have been using QAnon hashtags in 2020 and promoted some of the movement's common conspiracy theories.

Bollinger has appeared as part of the ReAwaken America tour, a political protest movement centered on opposition to COVID-19 mitigation measures and in favor of the conspiracy theory that the 2020 presidential election was stolen from Donald J. Trump.

References

1968 births
Living people
Alternative cancer treatment advocates
Alternative detoxification promoters
Alternative medicine activists
American anti-vaccination activists
American conspiracy theorists
COVID-19 conspiracy theorists
Pseudoscientific diet advocates